The Stara Synagogue, also known as Alte Szil and ‘’’Alt Stodt Shul’’’ meaning Old Town Synagogue was a "beautiful" synagogue in Łódź, Poland. The name Stara means old, many Polish cities called the oldest synagogue in town the Stara synagogue. The Stara was Łódź's principal Orthodox synagogue. It was built by Orthodox industrial magnates who wished to outshine, or at least compete with, the 1881 Great Synagogue (Łódź) built by the Reformed Jewish community.

History
Łódź, a village of fewer than 200 people at the end of the eighteenth century, developed rapidly into a great industrial city. Łódź's first synagogue, a wooden building, was built in 1809 at 8 Wolborska Street. The land was purchased from a lieutenant in the National Guard named Józef Aufschlag. By 1854 the building was in such poor condition that it was condemned by town authorities. Services are known to have continued thorough 1861 despite the official condemnation.

Work began in 1859 on a new, brick synagogue at 20 Wolborska Street designed by Jan Karol Mertsching in a neo-mannerist style. The new building opened in 1861. Construction, slowed by a financial crisis, continued until 1871.

The 1861 building was replaced between 1897 and 1900 by an elaborate Moorish Revival synagogue designed by Adolf Zeligson, a well-known Łódź architect. The architect's signed plans for the building were auctioned at Sotheby's on December 17, 2008, for $13,750.

According to Shimon Huberband (1909–1942), who documented the response of religious Jews of Poland to the Holocaust before he was murdered by the Nazis:  "The synagogue was very tall and beautiful. It contained two women's galleries. In all, it held fifteen hundred seats. There were thirty-six Torah scrolls in the synagogue and a large amount of silver Torah ornaments, including many antique works of art. All official public ceremonies took place in this synagogue".

The synagogue was burned to the ground on November 15–16, 1939 during the Nazi occupation.

See also
 Great Synagogue (Łódź)
 Ezras Israel Synagogue

References

Synagogues in Łódź
Moorish Revival synagogues
Synagogues completed in 1861
1861 establishments in the Russian Empire
Synagogues in Poland destroyed by Nazi Germany
19th-century religious buildings and structures in Poland